Herbet is a surname.  Notable people with the surname include:

Nikolaus Herbet (1889–?), German Nazi SS concentration camp commandant
Yves Herbet (born 1945), French footballer

See also
Herbert (surname)